The Happy Canyon of Santa Barbara is an American Viticultural Area (AVA) located in Santa Barbara County, California. The area comprises canyon terrain, hills, and river and creek basins to the east and south of the San Rafael Mountains, northwest of Lake Cachuma and north of the Santa Ynez River. It is home to six major vineyards and one active winery.

TTB received the petition from Wes Hagen, Vineyard Manager and Winemaker at Clos Pepe Vineyards, Lompoc, California, on behalf of Happy Canyon vintners and grape growers, proposing the establishment of the Happy Canyon of Santa Barbara American viticultural area.

References

External links
 Happy Canyon AVA 
 Getting to Know Happy Canyon, One of Southern California’s Tiniest AVAs VinePair
  Santa Ynez Wine Country Association
 TTB AVA Map

American Viticultural Areas of Southern California
Geography of Santa Barbara County, California
American Viticultural Areas
American Viticultural Areas of California
2009 establishments in California